The Straka Academy (in Czech: Strakova akademie) is the seat of the Government of the Czech Republic. It is a Neo-baroque building situated on the left bank of Vltava river, Malá Strana, Prague. It was designed by the architect Václav Roštlapil and built between 1891 and 1896. The building originally served as a dormitory for impoverished children of the Czech nobility.

References  

Buildings and structures in Prague
1896 establishments in Austria-Hungary
Government of the Czech Republic